Tamil books of law or the more correct, Classical Tamil phrase, are didactic Tamil works aimed to promote discipline (ஒழுக்கம்) among people. They were composed with intent to propound moral guidelines, often without specific religious affiliation, hence, many consider them to be secular. They are comparable to the dharmashastra of the Vedic culture.

Late Sangam period
Tirukkuṛaḷ (or the Kural)

Post Sangam period
Nālaṭiyār
Nāṉmaṇikkaṭikai
Iṉṉā Nāṟpatu
Iṉiyavai Nāṟpatu, Forty Sweet things
Tirikaṭukam, Three Medications
Ācārakkōvai
Paḻamoḻi Nāṉūṟu, Four-Hundred Sayings
Ciṟupañcamūlam, Minor Origin of the Five
Elāti
Mutumoḻikkānci

Middle ages
Aruṉkalaceppu
Aṟanericcāram, Chapter of Good Ethics
Naṟuttokai, Anthology of Goodness
Nītineṟiviḷakkam, Explanation of Laws and Morals
Nanneṟi, Good Ethics
Ulakanīti. Universal Law
Mutumoḻi Veṉpā The Venpa of Wise language
Āticūṭi, Classic of the Orchid
Konṟai Vēntan, Lord of the Golden Shower
Mūturai, Counsel of the wise
Nalvaḻi, Good path

Modern

Putiya Āticūṭi, New Āticūṭi
Neṟicūṭi, Classic of Ethics
Tamiḻcūṭi, Classic of Tamil
Nīticūṭi, Classic of Law
Nīticintāmaṉi, Thought gem of Law
Poṉmatimālai
Nītinūl, Book of Law
Nītipētam
Vivēkacintāmaṉi, Thought gem of wisdom

Legal history of India
Tamil-language literature
Tamil philosophy
Law books